Antonio Draghi (17 January 1634  – 16 January 1700) was a Baroque composer. He possibly was the brother of Giovanni Battista Draghi.

Draghi was born at Rimini in Italy, and was one of the most prolific composers of his time. His contribution to the development of Italian opera was particularly significant. He began his musical career as a choirboy at Padua, but by 1657 he was appearing on stage, in the opera La fortuna di Rodope e di Damira which was produced in Venice. His first solo effort, the opera La Mascherata, appeared in 1666.

In 1668, Draghi was appointed to the court of Leopold I, Holy Roman Emperor, at Vienna, and he remained there until his death.

List of operas
This is the complete list of the operas of Antonio Draghi.

References
The Oxford Dictionary of Opera, by John Warrack and Ewan West (1992),  782 pages,  
 Schnitzler, Rudolf; Seifert, Herbert (2001), "Draghi, Antonio", The New Grove Dictionary of Music and Musicians, Second Edition London: Macmillan. .
Seifert, Herbert (1998),  “Draghi, Antonio” in Stanley Sadie, (Ed.), The New Grove Dictionary of Opera, Vol. One, pp. 1237—1240. London: Macmillan Publishers, Inc.   
 

1630s births
1700 deaths
Italian Baroque composers
Italian male classical composers
Austrian classical composers
17th-century Italian composers
17th-century male musicians